The Technical University of Angola ( also called UTANGA) is a higher education university in Luanda, Angola. It was founded in 2007.

External links
 Official website 

Universities in Angola
Schools in Luanda
Educational institutions established in 2007
2007 establishments in Angola